Jelovec may refer to: 

In Croatia:
Jelovec, Croatia
Jelovec Voćanski in the Municipality of Donja Voća

In Slovenia:
Jelovec, Maribor, a settlement in the Municipality of Maribor
Jelovec pri Makolah, a settlement in the Municipality of Makole
Jelovec, Sevnica, a settlement in the Municipality of Sevnica
Jelovec, Sodražica, a settlement in the Municipality of Sodražica
Jelovec, Majšperk, a hamlet of Jelovice in the Municipality of Majšperk